Mungathala is an old village in Sirohi district of in Indian state of Rajasthan. It lies about 10 km north to Abu Road. Its old name is Mungasthala. The Saiva temple of Mogadesvara and Jain temple of Mahavira were celebrated temples of the place.

Mundasthala (मुण्डस्थल) is one of the Towns and Villages of  Balecha (Baliya) Chauhan Dominions.

This name occurs in number of epigraphs of 12th century as Mundasthala (मुण्डस्थल). This proves its antiquity. This was a sacred Shvetambara Jaina tirtha sacred to Mahavira. In an inscription of 14th century it is called Mahatirtha

Jain temples in Rajasthan
Villages in Sirohi district
Tourist attractions in Sirohi district
Abu Road